Heims Lake is a lake in Chisago County, Minnesota, in the United States.

Heims Lake was named for the family of Conrad Heim, an early settler.

See also
List of lakes in Minnesota

References

Lakes of Minnesota
Lakes of Chisago County, Minnesota